Teutoburgerwald may refer to
Teutoburg Forest, a mountain range in Germany
Battle of the Teutoburg Forest, 9 AD, between Germanic tribes and Roman legions
10661 Teutoburgerwald, an asteroid named after the mountains